Iglesia de la Santa Cruz (Inguanzo) is a Roman Catholic church in Asturias, Spain. Its steeple has been closed to the public since recent years due to collapse fears. It is a small church, however it is greatly attended during festivities by both locals and foreigners.

History
It was commissioned in 1780 by Pedro de Alonso Díaz in the baroque style. It is single-storied with a dome topped with a Latin cross. It also possesses an annexed bell tower.

On 17 January the attendees honour Saint Anton, and on 3 May the honour the Holy Cross. They are featured celebrations in the Asturian calendar.

See also
Asturian art
Catholic Church in Spain
 Churches in Asturias
 List of oldest church buildings

References

Churches in Asturias
18th-century Roman Catholic church buildings in Spain
Roman Catholic churches completed in 1780